Václav Hlavatý (27 January 1894 – 11 January 1969) was a noted Czech-American mathematician, who wrote on the theory of relativity and corresponded extensively with Albert Einstein on the subject.  In particular, Hlavatý solved some very difficult equations relating to Einstein's Unified field theory, which was featured in the news media as one of the great scientific achievements of 1953. Einstein himself was reported to have said that if anyone could solve the equations it would be Professor Hlavatý, which proved to be the case.

He was born in Louny, Bohemia (now in the Czech Republic) and died in Bloomington, Indiana. He obtained his PhD in 1921 at the Charles University in Prague and during World War II participated in the Prague uprising, but his academic career was mainly at Indiana University, which he joined in 1948, and where he became Professor, later Emeritus, of Mathematics. A special book of mathematical essays was published in his honour. In 1958, he became the first President of the Czechoslovak Society of Arts and Sciences established in Washington DC by intellectuals of Czech and Slovak origin.

He was an Invited Speaker of the ICM in 1928 in Bologna and in 1936 in Oslo.

In 1931 he married Olga Neumannova, and they had a daughter, Olga.

Some publications

Articles

Books
 
 

References

External links 
 
 Václav Hlavatý biography (in Czech)
 Václav Hlavatý biography (in Czech) includes photograph

1894 births
1969 deaths
People from Louny
People from the Kingdom of Bohemia
Czech National Social Party politicians
Members of the Interim National Assembly of Czechoslovakia
Czech mathematicians
Charles University alumni
Czechoslovak emigrants to the United States
American people of Czech descent
20th-century American mathematicians
Indiana University faculty
Recipients of the Order of Tomáš Garrigue Masaryk